Commander, Submarine Force Atlantic (COMSUBLANT) is the Submarine Force U.S. Atlantic Fleet type commander under the United States Fleet Forces Command.

The principal responsibility of the Admiral commanding is to operate, maintain, train, and equip submarines. COMSUBLANT also has additional duties as commander of NATO's Allied Submarine Command and also Commander, Naval Submarine Forces. As Commander, Naval Submarine Forces (COMSUBFOR), an additional type commander role, he also supervises Commander, Submarine Force Pacific (often known as COMSUBPAC). From the 1960s to the 1990s the commander also held the NATO post of Commander, Submarines, Western Atlantic (COMSUBWESTLANT).

History
Established on 7 December 1941, Rear Admiral Richard S. Edwards was its first commander. COMSUBLANT headquarters was at Naval Submarine Base New London until 1960, when it was moved to Naval Station Norfolk. U.S. submarine operations in the Atlantic, however, date from before World War I. On January 1, 1913, Lieutenant Chester W. Nimitz was in command of the Atlantic Submarine Flotilla, with First Group consisting of submarines C-2, C-3, C-4, and C-5 under Lieutenant Lewis D. Causey, and Second Group consisting of submarines D-1, D-2, D-3, E-1, and E-2 under Lieutenant (junior grade) Claudius R. Hyatt. Nimitz was in command from May 1912 to March 1913.

In October 1945, Submarine Squadron 2 was established at Naval Submarine Base New London, Groton, Connecticut, and in February 1946, Submarine Squadron 8 was commissioned at Groton.

"In correspondence of 31 January 1949, the Chief of Naval Operations directed 'that the Fleet Commanders assign one division in each fleet to [the] sole task [of solving] the problem of using submarines to detect and destroy enemy submarines. All other operations of any nature, even type training, ASW services, or fleet tactics, shall be subordinated to this mission.' After a further exchange of correspondence, Submarine Forces Atlantic established Submarine Development Group 2, consisting of four Diesel submarines, two Guppy (Greater Underwater Propulsion Power Program) conversions and two standard fleet boats." The initial staff included Captain Roy S. Benson, two officers and two yeomen reporting directly to him.

In 1951, Submarine Squadron 10 was established at State Pier, New London, Connecticut. The squadron has the distinction of being the only unit associated with Submarine Base New London to actually be located in New London instead of Groton. In the early 1960s Squadron 10 became the first all-nuclear United States submarine squadron.

In December 1969, Submarine Squadron 8 was decommissioned.

Submarine Squadron 14 operated Fleet Ballistic Missile boats from Holy Loch, Scotland, from 1961 until it was disbanded in 1992. COMSUBLANT also oversaw Submarine Squadron 22 at La Maddalena in the Mediterranean, which existed 1972–2008 and was known as Submarine Refit and Training Group La Maddalena from 1972 to the mid-1980s. Submarine Group 8 continues to operate in support of U.S. and NATO objectives there.

On 1 May 1977, Submarine Development Group 2 was officially redesignated as Submarine Development Squadron 12 in recognition of its role and responsibilities and new organizational status. In August 1979, Submarine Squadron 8 was recommissioned in Norfolk, where it remained until consolidation with Submarine Squadron 6 on April 28, 2011. On January 13, 2012, Submarine Squadron 2 similarly was disestablished, transferring its boats to Submarine Squadron 4 and Submarine Development Squadron 12.

As Commander, Task Force 42, COMSUBLANT operated Atlantic Fleet attack submarines. In addition, as Commander, Task Force 84, the previous Atlantic Fleet special surveillance and anti-submarine warfare commander, COMSUBLANT operates submarines, Maritime Patrol Aircraft, surface ships assigned by Fleet Forces Command and Integrated Undersea Surveillance System assets.

As of 2011, SUBLANT numbers 30 submarines and more than 15,000 officers, enlisted, and civilian personnel providing combat ready submarines in the Atlantic, Arctic, Eastern Pacific, and Indian Oceans and the Mediterranean Sea.

Commander, Naval Submarine Forces wrote in June 2012 on his blog: "We're not perfect. In the Submarine Force we've had some high-visibility lapses in character. You've read about them: the cheating incident on USS MEMPHIS, the fraternization between the Chief of the Boat and a female midshipman on USS NEBRASKA, an incident of hazing on USS Florida, and the financial misconduct of some Supply Officers in Kings Bay. In each case, once discovered, these incidents were thoroughly investigated, and appropriate people were held accountable. This is our approach and we'll continue to address these cases swiftly and decisively."
 
There have also been previous problems of this nature. Commander Michael J. Alfonso was relieved as Commander, Blue Crew, USS Florida (SSBN-728) in 1997 for ignoring his executive officer and browbeating his crew.

Rear Admiral Kenneth Perry, Commander, Submarine Group 2, retired on Friday, August 22, 2014, and the post of Commander Submarine Group 2 was disestablished that day. The responsibilities of the 45 personnel in the group headquarters have been shifted to the individual submarine squadrons. The new arrangement, with Submarine Squadrons reporting directly to the Submarine type commander for the fleet, mirrors that functioning in the Pacific.

Submarines and units
These are the submarines and related units reporting to COMSUBLANT.

Norfolk, Virginia
Commander, Submarine Squadron 6 (COMSUBRON Six):

 USS San Francisco (SSN 711)

 
USS Pasadena (SSN 752)
 
 
 USS New Hampshire (SSN 778)
USS John Warner (SSN 785)
USS Washington (SSN 787)
USS Montana (SSN 794)
USS New Jersey (SSN 796)
USS Massachusetts (SSN 798)

Groton, Connecticut
Commander, Submarine Group 2 (COMSUBGRU Two)
Submarine Group 2 was disestablished on 22 August 2014. It had been previously designated Submarine Flotilla Two and was active in the Atlantic Fleet from at least 1978 to 2014 and based in Groton, CT. (Ships and Aircraft, Eleventh Edition, 1978)

Commander, Submarine Squadron 2 (COMSUBRON Two):
Submarine Squadron 2 was disestablished in 2012 and all COMSUBRON 2 assigned attack submarines were assigned to COMSUBRON 4 or Commander, Submarine Development Squadron 12.

Commander, Submarine Squadron 4 (COMSUBRON Four):
 USS Montpelier (SSN 765)

USS Minnesota (SSN 783)
USS North Dakota (SSN 784)
USS Colorado (SSN 788)
USS South Dakota (SSN 790)
USS Vermont (SSN 792)
USS Oregon (SSN 793)
USS Hyman G. Rickover (SSN 795)
USS Iowa (SSN 797)
USS Idaho (SSN 799)

Commander, Submarine Squadron 12 (COMSUBRON 12):
 
 
USS Santa Fe (SSN 763)
USS Toledo (SSN 769)
USS Virginia (SSN 774)
USS Texas (SSN 775)
USS New Mexico (SSN 779)
USS California (SSN 781)
USS Indiana (SSN 789)
USS Delaware (SSN 791)

Submarine Development Squadron 12's mission, as assigned by the Chief of Naval Operations, is to develop the tactics and promulgate the tactical doctrine to conduct submarine warfare. Organized as Submarine Development Group 2 on 9 May 1949, the original charter was to solve the problem of using submarines to defeat and destroy enemy submarines. During the intervening years this charter has grown in scope to support the full range of submarine missions including arctic warfare, anti-submarine warfare, anti-surface ship warfare, mine warfare and tactical strike warfare. With the vastly improved capabilities of the modern nuclear submarine and a weapons delivery capability that include mines, torpedoes, and cruise missiles, there are few naval warfare missions which cannot be conducted by submarines. On 1 May 1977, Submarine Development Group 2 was officially re-designated as Submarine Development Squadron 12 in recognition of its expanded role and responsibilities and new organizational status. The Headquarters has been located at the Naval Submarine Base New London, Groton, Connecticut since 1949. Submarine Development Squadron 12 also commands a squadron of the most modern attack submarines.

On January 15, 2016 Submarine Development Squadron 12 was re-designated Submarine Squadron 12, given the tactical development responsibilities fall under the Undersea Warfighting Development Center

Portsmouth, New Hampshire/Maine

Portsmouth Naval Shipyard serves as one of the primary maintenance facilities for U.S. submarines from both the Atlantic and Pacific. No submarines are officially based here.

Kings Bay, Georgia

Commander, Submarine Group 10 (COMSUBGRU Ten)
Commander, Submarine Squadron 16 (COMSUBRON Sixteen):
 
 

Commander, Submarine Squadron 20 (COMSUBRON Twenty):
 
 
 
 
 
USS Wyoming (SSBN 742)

Officers serving as COMSUBLANT

The following is an incomplete list:
Rear Admiral Richard S. Edwards, 1941–1942
Rear Admiral Freeland A. Daubin, 1942–1944
Rear Admiral Charles W. Styer, 1944–1946
Rear Admiral John Wilkes, 1946–1947
Rear Admiral James Fife, Jr., 1947–1950
Rear Admiral Stuart S. "Sunshine" Murray, 1950–1952
Rear Admiral George C. "Turkey Neck" Crawford, 1952–1954
Rear Admiral Frank T. Watkins, 1954–1957
Rear Admiral Charles W. "Weary" Wilkins, March–September 1957†
Rear Admiral Frederick B. Warder, September 1957 – 1960†
Rear Admiral Lawrence R. "Dan" Daspit, January–September 1960†
Vice Admiral Elton W. "Joe" Grenfell, September 1960 – 1964† (also COMSUBPAC, 1964–1966)
Vice Admiral Vernon L. "Rebel" Lowrance, 1964–1966†
Vice Admiral Arnold F. Schade, 1966–1970†
Vice Admiral Eugene P. Wilkinson, 1970–1972 (last WW2 submarine officer to hold the position)
Vice Admiral Robert L. J. Long, 1972–1974
Vice Admiral J. Williams Jr, 1974–1977
Vice Admiral Kenneth M. Carr, 1977–1980
Vice Admiral Steven A. White, 1980–1983
Vice Admiral Bernard M. Kauderer, 1983–1986
Vice Admiral Daniel 'Dan' L. Cooper, 1986–1988
Vice Admiral Roger F. Bacon, 1988–1990
Vice Admiral Henry "Hank" G. Chiles, 1990–1993
Vice Admiral George W. Emery, 1993–1996
Vice Admiral Richard W. Mies, 1996–1998
Vice Admiral Edmund P. Giambiastiani, 1998–2000
Vice Admiral John J. Grossenbacher, 2000–2003
Vice Admiral Kirk H. Donald, 2003–2004
Vice Admiral Charles L. Munns, 2004–2007
Vice Admiral John J. Donnelly, 2007–2010
Vice Admiral John Richardson, 2010–2012
Vice Admiral Michael J. Connor, 2012–2015
Vice Admiral Joseph E. Tofalo, 2015–2018
Vice Admiral Charles A. Richard 2018–2019
Vice Admiral Daryl Caudle 2019-2021
Vice Admiral William J. Houston 2021–Present

† Wartime submarine commander

References

External links
Official site
Globalsecurity.org link

Commander, Submarine Atlantic
Commander, Submarine Atlantic
Military history of the Atlantic Ocean
Military units and formations established in 1941